Georg Friedrich Benecke (10 June 1762, Mönchsroth – 21 August 1844, Göttingen) was a German philologist.

Beginning in 1780, he was a student at the University of Göttingen, where he was a pupil of Christian Gottlob Heyne. In 1814 he became a full professor at Göttingen, and later on, acquired duties as a head librarian.

His studies most notably involved old German and English literature. He was editor of a dictionary to Hartmann von Aue's Ywain (1874). His preliminary work on a collection of Middle High German words was edited and published by Wilhelm Müller and Friedrich Zarncke after his death ("Mittelhochdeutsches Wörterbuch").

Selected works 
 Beyträge zur Kenntniss der altdeutschen Sprache und Litteratur, 1810.
 Minnelieder. Ergänzung der Sammlung von Minnesingern, Göttingen 1810.
 Der Edel Stein / getichtet von Bonerius, aus Handschriften berichtigt und mit einem Wörterbuch versehen, Berlin 1816.
 Wigalois von Wirnt von Gravenberch, Berlin 1819.
 Iwein. Der Riter mit dem Lewen von Hartmann von Aue, (with Karl Lachmann), Berlin 1827.
 Wörterbuch zu Hartmanns Iwein, 1833.
 Mittelhochdeutsches Wörterbuch (with Wilhelm Müller and Friedrich Zarncke, published posthumously; Leipzig 1854–66, 4 parts).

External links and references 
 

German philologists
German librarians
Academic staff of the University of Göttingen
University of Göttingen alumni
People from Ansbach (district)
1844 deaths
1762 births
Members of the Göttingen Academy of Sciences and Humanities